"Someone You Loved" is a song recorded by Scottish singer-songwriter Lewis Capaldi. It was released as a download on 8 November 2018 through Vertigo Records and Universal Music as the third single from his second extended play, Breach (2018), and was later included on his debut album, Divinely Uninspired to a Hellish Extent (2019). The song was written by Capaldi, Samuel Romans, and its producers Thomas Barnes, Peter Kelleher and Benjamin Kohn. It was serviced to radio stations on 16 April 2019 as the first US single.

"Someone You Loved" was a commercial success, peaking at number one on the UK Singles Chart. The song became Capaldi's first number one single, spending seven consecutive weeks atop of the chart and was the best selling single of 2019 in the UK. It also peaked at number one on the Irish Singles Chart in March 2019. In the United States, "Someone You Loved", a piano ballad, was a sleeper hit, topping the Billboard Hot 100 in its 24th week on the chart. It was nominated for Song of the Year at the 62nd Grammy Awards. It also received an award for Song of the Year at the 2020 Brit Awards. As of 2021, "Someone You Loved" is the 4th most streamed song on Spotify, with 2.3 billion streams on the platform.

Background and composition
In an interview with the French magazine Brut, Capaldi revealed he wrote the song about his grandmother who had died. In an interview with NME, Capaldi revealed that it took him six months to write the song. He said, "A lot of people say that 'the best songs fall into your lap' and that they're the easiest ones to write and take the shortest amount of time: I wholeheartedly disagree with that. I think my best songs come from me sitting at a piano, bashing my head against a brick wall for hours and hours on end to get one good melody." "Someone You Loved" is played in the tempo of 110 BPM and key signature of D♭ major.

Music videos
There are two music videos to accompany "Someone You Loved".

The first music video was released on 8 February 2019, starring actor Peter Capaldi, who is Lewis Capaldi's second cousin once removed. It was directed by filmmaker Phil Beastall. Filming took place in Buxton in late January 2019. The video was made in partnership with charity organisation Live Life Give Life in order to raise awareness for the issue of organ donation. It contains a message of loss and hope, telling a story of a husband who is trying to cope with the death of his wife. She became the heart donor for the young mother of another family, saving her life. Eventually the two families are brought together and the main character knows that his wife's heart continues to live on.

An alternate music video, featuring the singer was released on 29 August 2019. Here, Capaldi wanders the streets, following his lost love as his friends and strangers try to stop him from chasing after her. His brother, Aidan, also made an appearance in the video.

Capaldi said: "For me the video is about the people we surround ourselves with that have the strength when we don't and help us continue to make the right decisions in moments of fear or hardship. In the moment we often choose to ignore friends and family, thinking our judgement is better, but of course in hindsight when you’re in that headspace it’s almost impossible to make the right decisions."

Chart performance
"Someone You Loved" reached number one on the UK Singles Chart and stayed there for seven consecutive weeks. It is also Capaldi's first entry on the US Billboard Hot 100, debuting at number 85 on the issue dated 25 May 2019 and becoming the singer's first number-one single in the country on the issue dated 2 November 2019. It reached number one after 24 weeks on the chart, becoming one of the longest climbs to the top position in Billboard history. After three non-consecutive weeks on top it was replaced by Post Malone's "Circles".

In Ireland, the single cumulated 26.8 million streams in 2019 and was the biggest-selling song in the country that year.

Track listing
Digital download
"Someone You Loved" – 3:02

Digital download
"Someone You Loved" (Future Humans Remix) – 3:09

Digital download
"Someone You Loved" (Madism Radio Mix)– 2:37

CD single
"Someone You Loved" – 3:02
"Someone You Loved" (Madism Radio Mix) – 2:37
"Someone You Loved" (Instrumental) – 3:02
"Voice Note From Lewis"

Personnel
 TMS – production, mixing
 Phil Cook – strings
 Lewis Capaldi – vocals, piano
 Robert Voseign – mastering
 Ryan Walter – artwork design
 Ali Gavillet – photography

Charts

Weekly charts

Year-end charts

Decade-end charts

Certifications

Release history

Covers
The Piano Guys covered the song in a piano and cello composition on their video featuring World of Dance season 2 contestants Charity Anderson and Andres Penate. 

Nicola Roberts performed the song in her Queen Bee disguise on the first series of The Masked Singer UK. 

Camila Cabello and the Jonas Brothers covered the song during BBC Radio 1's Live Lounge, while Bastille, Charlie Puth, and Alec Benjamin covered the song for Sirius XM.

Capaldi performed the song as a surprise guest with Nina Nesbitt and James Bay at their concerts, and with Alicia Keys at the 2019 iHeartRadio Music Festival.

See also
 List of best-selling singles in Australia
 List of Billboard Hot 100 number-one singles of 2019
 List of Canadian Hot 100 number-one singles of 2019
 List of number-one singles of 2019 (Ireland)
 List of number-one songs of 2019 (Malaysia)
 List of UK Singles Chart number ones of the 2010s
 List of Billboard Adult Contemporary number ones of 2019 and 2020 (U.S.)

References

Internet memes
2018 songs
2018 singles
Billboard Hot 100 number-one singles
Brit Award for British Single
Canadian Hot 100 number-one singles
Irish Singles Chart number-one singles
Number-one singles in Malaysia
Lewis Capaldi songs
UK Singles Chart number-one singles
Songs written by Romans (musician)
Songs written by Peter Kelleher (songwriter)
Songs written by Tom Barnes (songwriter)
Songs written by Ben Kohn
Song recordings produced by TMS (production team)
Pop ballads
Songs written by Lewis Capaldi
2010s ballads
Songs about heartache
Universal Music Group singles
Vertigo Records singles
Virgin Records singles